Andrew Peterson may refer to:

 Andrew Peterson (musician) (born 1974), American Christian singer-songwriter and author
 Andrew Peterson (soccer) (born 1984), American soccer player, currently playing for Minnesota Thunder in the USL First Division
 Andrew Thomas Turton Peterson (1813–1906), Anglo-Indian barrister, spiritualist and amateur architect
 Andrew Peterson (American football) (born 1972), retired American professional football player
 Andrew Peterson, namesake of the Andrew Peterson Farmstead, Waconia, Minnesota
 Andrew Peterson, flight engineer on Federal Express Flight 705
 Andy Peterson, American college football coach

See also
 Andrew Petersen (1870–1953), U.S. Representative from New York